Sphaeromorda magnithorax is a species of beetle in the genus Sphaeromorda of the family Mordellidae, which is part of the superfamily Tenebrionoidea. It was described in 1965 by Franciscolo.

References

Beetles described in 1965
Mordellidae